Russia is a town in Herkimer County, New York, United States. The population was 2,587 at the 2010 census. The town is located in the northwestern part of the county and is northeast of Utica.

The northern part of the town is in the Adirondack Park.

History 

The area was first settled circa 1792. The town of Russia was formed from the town of Norway in 1806 as the "Town of Union." The name was changed to "Russia" in 1808. In 1836, part of Russia, along with part of the town of Ohio, was used to form the now-defunct town of Willmurt. When the town of Webb was formed in 1896, much of Willmurt was transferred to Webb with the rest returned to Ohio.

In 1865, the population of Russia was 2,030.

Geography
Hinckley Reservoir, an impoundment on West Canada Creek, crosses the north-central part of the town. West Canada Creek forms the western boundary of the town (the border with Oneida County, south of the reservoir.

New York State Route 8 and New York State Route 28 converge at Poland village.

Demographics

As of the census of 2000, there were 2,487 people, 993 households, and 707 families residing in the town.  The population density was 44.0 people per square mile (17.0/km2).  There were 1,252 housing units at an average density of 22.1 per square mile (8.5/km2).  The racial makeup of the town was 97.75% White, 0.32% African American, 0.56% Native American, 0.72% Asian, 0.12% from other races, and 0.52% from two or more races. Hispanic or Latino of any race were 0.44% of the population.

There were 993 households, out of which 30.8% had children under the age of 18 living with them, 56.9% were married couples living together, 7.0% had a female householder with no husband present, and 28.8% were non-families. 23.1% of all households were made up of individuals, and 7.7% had someone living alone who was 65 years of age or older.  The average household size was 2.50 and the average family size was 2.90.

In the town, the population was spread out, with 24.8% under the age of 18, 6.6% from 18 to 24, 28.1% from 25 to 44, 26.4% from 45 to 64, and 14.0% who were 65 years of age or older.  The median age was 39 years. For every 100 females, there were 109.7 males.  For every 100 females age 18 and over, there were 107.4 males.

The median income for a household in the town was $35,588, and the median income for a family was $40,847. Males had a median income of $29,798 versus $20,968 for females. The per capita income for the town was $17,563.  About 12.1% of families and 14.9% of the population were below the poverty line, including 25.8% of those under age 18 and 13.9% of those age 65 or over.

Communities and locations in Russia 
Buck Hill – An elevation located north of Poland.
Cold Brook – The village of Cold Brook is east of Poland village on NY-8.
Gang Mills – A former community in the northwestern part of the town. The name is from the large number of lumber mills once located in the settlement.
Grant – A hamlet in the northeastern part of the town, on Black Creek, south of the Hinckley Reservoir on County Road 184.
Gravesville – A hamlet west of Russia village, located on Gravesville Road (County Road 242).  It is named after William Graves, an early settler.
Hinckley Reservoir – An impoundment on West Canada Creek in the northern part of the town.
Northwood – A hamlet on the western town line north of the Hinckley Reservoir.
Pardeeville Corners – A location southeast of Grant.
Poland – The village of Poland is at the southern town line by West Canada Creek at the junction of NY-8 and NY-28.
Russia Corners – The hamlet of Russia is in the south-central part of the town, north of Poland at the junction of County Route 47 (Military Rd), County Route 133 (Russia Rd), and Beecher Road.  The Russia Corners Historic District was added to the National Register of Historic Places in 1996.
Sand Hill – An elevation located just northeast of the village of Cold Brook off NY Route 8.
Trenton Falls – A hamlet at the western town line on County Road 247.
Wheelertown –  A hamlet in the northern part of Russia, located on Wheelertown Road.

References

External links
  Town of Russia official website
 Early history of Russia, NY
  Early Russia, NY  history
Herkimer County Historical Society

Utica–Rome metropolitan area
Towns in Herkimer County, New York